Bradford West Gwillimbury is a town in south-central Ontario, in the County of Simcoe in the Toronto Census Metropolitan Area on the Holland River. West Gwillimbury takes its name from the family of Elizabeth Simcoe, née Gwillim.

The former Town of Bradford was amalgamated with portions of the former Townships of West Gwillimbury and Tecumseth to become the Town of Bradford West Gwillimbury on January 1, 1991.

Communities
Holland Marsh, a region of #9 humus soil, is located partly in Bradford West Gwillimbury.  The town, along with the Township of King is the governing body responsible for the maintenance of the drainage system of this source of Canada's produce supply.  In 2007 a Holland Marsh Drainage System Joint Municipal Board was created in response to a crisis of maintenance of the Holland Marsh Drainage System.

The Holland River flows through the middle of the southernmost Holland Marsh polder and eventually flows out to Lake Simcoe. Geographically, the area is north of the Oak Ridges Moraine.

Bradford West Gwillimbury consists of the town of Bradford and the former Township of West Gwillimbury, and includes the communities of Bond Head, Coulson's Hill, Deerhurst, Dunkerron, Green Valley, Newton Robinson and Pinkerton.

Government

The current mayor of Bradford West Gwillimbury is James Leduc, who previously served as the towns Deputy Mayor under Rob Keller who retired from public service in the lead-up to the 2022 Municipal Election. Raj Sandhu took Leduc's post as Deputy Mayor after serving as the Councilor for Ward 1. The first mayor was Bill de Peuter, who was mayor of Bradford from 1986 to 1990.

The municipality has a mayor, a deputy mayor, and seven councillors.  The administration is led by a town manager and has the following departments: clerks, building, planning, human resources, recreation, finance, engineering, facilities and parks, fire and IT. Council shared space with a courthouse at 57 Holland Street East.

Bradford West Gwillimbury and the neighbouring town of Innisfil share the South Simcoe Police Service.  The town also incorporates the YNOT Bradford West Gwillimbury Youth Council, an assembly of teens, into its town discussions.  The non-governmental group works to create social opportunities, including recreation facilities; enhance environmentalism; and create a political voice for the town's youth.

Federally, the town is part of the riding of York—Simcoe, represented by Scot Davidson of the Conservative Party, who elected in a by-election on February 25, 2019. Provincially, it is part of the riding of York—Simcoe, represented by Tory MPP Caroline Mulroney.

Bradford West Gwillimbury is part of the Toronto CMA but is not part of the Greater Toronto Area.

Fire & Emergency Services
Fire & Emergency Services has vastly evolved from the traditional functions of fire suppression and fire prevention.  In addition to structural fire calls, the Fire Suppression division responds to calls such as residential and commercial fire alarms, motor vehicle collisions, vehicle fires, specialized rescues such as technical rope, confined space, and ice-water rescues, tiered medicals (ambulance assists) hazardous material responses (HAZMAT), mutual aid requests, as well as assistance during times of natural and/or man made disasters.

Bradford West Gwillimbury Fire & Emergency Services Headquarters is located at 75 Melbourne Drive, and currently has a fleet of 6 frontline apparatus, a fire prevention van, 2 Fire Chief vehicles, and a specialized response trailer.

Even though Bradford West Gwillimbury is part of Simcoe County, the station number and apparatus numbers are based on the York Region Fire Services numbering system, thus, Bradford is District 10, Station #1 (Station 10-1).

Transportation

The town is served by Highway 400 and Highway 9 at the southern border. It is also served by a number of Simcoe county roads, including 88 (Holland Street West), 4 (Bridge Street, Holland Street East, and Barrie Street), 27, 41 (Simcoe Road), and 8 (Canal Road).

The town is also located on a bus and commuter train route, served by GO Transit. Bradford GO Station is located in the community of Bradford and is on the Barrie line. The station had been the northern terminus of the line until its extension opened in December 2007.

Bradford West Gwillimbury operates a local transit service, BWG Transit, which operates two routes primarily around Bradford. The routes provide a local transit connection to the town's railway station, and the bus system operates six days a week.

Notable people
Also see Notable people from Bradford, Ontario
William Mulock, lawyer, businessman, educator, farmer, politician, judge, and philanthropist who is credited with the formation of the modern University of Toronto, was born on January 19, 1843, at Bond Head.
William Osler, called the "most influential physician in history", was born on July 12, 1849, at Bond Head, Canada West (now Ontario).
 Newton Robinson was the birthplace of NHL Hall of Famer, Bob Pulford.

Demographics

See also
List of townships in Ontario

References

External links

Lower-tier municipalities in Ontario
Municipalities in Simcoe County
Towns in Ontario